Merlin Cadogan (born in 1974) is an escapologist who reached the semi-finals of Britain's Got Talent in 2009.  He set a Guinness World Record for the longest time to juggle three objects underwater on a single breath, with a time of one minute and 20 seconds. He also broke the Guinness world record for picking the most police handcuffs in one minute (six sets) live on ITV's Magic Numbers in 2010.

Merlin currently works at the Milkyway near Bideford, as an entertainer.

References

Living people
1974 births
Date of birth missing (living people)
Britain's Got Talent contestants
English buskers
English entertainers
Escapologists
Jugglers